Saros cycle series 141 for solar eclipses occurs at the Moon's ascending node, repeats every 18 years, 11 days and contains 70 events. The series started with a partial solar eclipse on May 19, 1613. It contains 41 annular eclipses from August 4, 1739 through October 14, 2460. There are no total eclipses in this series. The series ends at member 70 as a partial eclipse on June 13, 2857. All eclipses in this series occurs at the Moon's ascending node.

Longest Annular Solar Eclipse: Annular Solar Eclipse on Wednesday, December 14, 1955 - 12 minutes, 9 seconds

Smallest Annular Solar Eclipse: Annular Solar Eclipse on Monday, December 24, 1973 - Magnitude: 0.9174

This solar saros is linked to Lunar Saros 134.

Umbral eclipses
Umbral eclipses can be classified as either: 1) Central (two limits), 2) Central (one limit) or 3) Non-Central (one limit). The statistical distribution of these classes in Saros series 141 appears in the following table.

Events

Notes

References 
 http://eclipse.gsfc.nasa.gov/SEsaros/SEsaros141.html

External links
Saros cycle 140 - Information and visualization

Solar saros series